is a Japanese foil fencer, gold medallist at the 2006 Asian Games, silver medallist at the 2008 Summer Olympics, team silver medallist at the 2012 Summer Olympics, and individual gold medallist at the 2015 World Fencing Championships. He is a member of the International Olympic Committee (IOC).

Career 
Yuki took up fencing in his elementary school years at the instigation of his father, a Zorro fan and keen amateur fencer. He won the national junior high school championships. In Heian High School, he got third consecutive championship victories in national high school championships.

Ota climbed his first World Cup podium with a victory at the 2004 Tehran World Cup. He qualified for the 2004 Summer Olympics in Athens, his first Olympic participation, but was defeated in the table of 16 by Russia's Renal Ganeyev. He later explained he had felt completely overpowered: "It was on a whole other level. In F1 terms, it was like the finalists were equipped with completely different engines." Demotivated, he was taken over in world rankings by friend and rival Kenta Chida, whom he always used to beat, and contemplated giving up competition to take a regular job.

In 2006, Ota resumed training with Japan's national coach, Ukrainian Oleg Matseichuk, from whom he had always kept his distances before. He won a gold medal at the 2006 Asian Games in Doha and at the 2008 Asian Fencing Championships held in Bangkok.

In the 2008 Summer Olympics in Beijing, Ota reached the final of the men's individual foil held on 13 August 2008, by beating Germany's Peter Joppich 15–12 in the quarter finals and Salvatore Sanzo 15–14 in the semifinals. He lost 15–9 to Benjamin Kleibrink in the final, thus winning the silver medal, Japan's first Olympic medal. He was then recruited by French club ASPTT Aix-en-Provence and took part in the team event of the 2009 French national championship along with Erwann Le Péchoux and Marcel Marcilloux. In the 2008–09 season, Ota moved to the top of the world rankings after finishing runner-up in the Moscow World Cup.

At the 2012 Summer Olympics, he lost in the third round of the individual foil competition, but won a silver medal in the team foil event. At the 2015 World Fencing Championships, he won gold in the Men's foil event, becoming the first Japanese to win a world championship in any event in fencing.

Ota graduated from Doshisha University. He is a member of the athletes commission of the International Fencing Federation.

References

External links 

 Sanspo.com 

1985 births
Living people
Asian Games medalists in fencing
Doshisha University alumni
Fencers at the 2004 Summer Olympics
Fencers at the 2006 Asian Games
Fencers at the 2008 Summer Olympics
Fencers at the 2010 Asian Games
Fencers at the 2012 Summer Olympics
Fencers at the 2014 Asian Games
Japanese male foil fencers
Medalists at the 2008 Summer Olympics
Medalists at the 2012 Summer Olympics
Olympic fencers of Japan
Olympic silver medalists for Japan
Olympic medalists in fencing
People from Ōtsu, Shiga
Asian Games gold medalists for Japan
Asian Games silver medalists for Japan
Asian Games bronze medalists for Japan
Fencers at the 2016 Summer Olympics
Medalists at the 2006 Asian Games
Medalists at the 2010 Asian Games
Medalists at the 2014 Asian Games
International Olympic Committee members
21st-century Japanese people
20th-century Japanese people